Trupanea convergens is a species of tephritid or fruit flies in the genus Trupanea of the family Tephritidae.

Distribution
Taiwan, China.

References

Tephritinae
Insects described in 1936
Diptera of Asia